Mueang Kamphaeng Phet is the capital district (amphoe mueang) of Kamphaeng Phet province, central Thailand.

Geography
Neighboring districts are (from the northwest clockwise) Kosamphi Nakhon, Phran Kratai, Sai Ngam, Khlong Khlung, Khlong Lan of Kamphaeng Phet Province and  Wang Chao of Tak province.

History
In 1917 the district was renamed Mueang Kamphaeng Phet.

Administration

Central administration 
The district Mueang Kamphaeng Phet is divided into 16 sub-districts (tambons), which are further subdivided into 220 administrative villages (mubans).

Missing numbers are the tambon which now form Kosamphi Nakhon District.

Local administration 
There are two towns (thesaban mueangs) in the district:
 Kamphaeng Phet consisting of sub-district Nai Mueang.
 Nong Pling consisting of sub-district Nong Pling.

There are five sub-district municipalities (thesaban tambons) in the district:
 Khlong Mae Lai consisting of parts of sub-districts Ang Thong, Khlong Mae Lai.
 Nakhon Chum consisting of parts of sub-district Nakhon Chum.
 Pak Dong consisting of parts of sub-district Trai Trueng.
 Thep Nakhon consisting of sub-district Thep Nakhon.
 Nikhom Thung Pho Thale consisting of sub-district Nikhom Thung Pho Thale.

There are 12 sub-district administrative organizations (SAO) in the district:
 Trai Trueng consisting of parts of sub-district Trai Trueng.
 Ang Thong consisting of parts of sub-district Ang Thong.
 Na Bo Kham consisting of sub-district Na Bo Kham.
 Nakhon Chum consisting of parts of sub-district Nakhon Chum.
 Song Tham consisting of sub-district Song Tham.
 Lan Dokmai consisting of sub-district Lan Dokmai.
 Khonthi consisting of sub-district Khonthi.
 Wang Thong consisting of sub-district Wang Thong.
 Tha Khun Ram consisting of sub-district Tha Khun Ram.
 Khlong Mae Lai consisting of parts of sub-district Khlong Mae Lai.
 Thammarong consisting of sub-district Thammarong.
 Sa Kaeo consisting of sub-district Sa Kaeo.

See also
 Kamphaeng Phet province

References

External links
amphoe.com (Thai)

Mueang Kamphaeng Phet